In computer science, in particular in formal language theory, a quotient automaton can be obtained from a given nondeterministic finite automaton by joining some of its states. The quotient recognizes a superset of the given automaton; in some cases, handled by the Myhill–Nerode theorem, both languages are equal.

Formal definition

A (nondeterministic) finite automaton is a quintuple A = ⟨Σ, S, s0, δ, Sf⟩, where:
 Σ is the input alphabet (a finite, non-empty set of symbols),
 S is a finite, non-empty set of states,
 s0 is the initial state, an element of S,
 δ is the state-transition relation: δ ⊆ S × Σ × S, and
 Sf is the set of final states, a (possibly empty) subset of S.

A string a1...an ∈ Σ* is recognized by A if there exist states s1, ..., sn ∈ S such that ⟨si-1,ai,si⟩ ∈ δ for i=1,...,n, and sn ∈ Sf. The set of all strings recognized by A is called the language recognized by A; it is denoted as L(A).

For an equivalence relation ≈ on the set S of A’s states, the quotient automaton A/≈ = ⟨Σ, S/≈, [s0], δ/≈, Sf/≈⟩ is defined by
 the input alphabet Σ being the same as that of A,
 the state set S/≈ being the set of all equivalence classes of states from S,
 the start state [s0] being the equivalence class of A’s start state,
 the state-transition relation δ/≈ being defined by δ/≈([s],a,[t]) if δ(s,a,t) for some s ∈ [s] and t ∈ [t], and
 the set of final states Sf/≈ being the set of all equivalence classes of final states from Sf.

The process of computing A/≈ is also called factoring A by ≈.

Example

For example, the automaton A shown in the first row of the table is formally defined by 
 ΣA = {0,1},
 SA = {a,b,c,d},
 s = a,
 δA = { ⟨a,1,b⟩, ⟨b,0,c⟩, ⟨c,0,d⟩ }, and
 S = { b,c,d }.
It recognizes the finite set of strings { 1, 10, 100 }; this set can also be denoted by the regular expression "1+10+100".

The relation (≈) = { ⟨a,a⟩, ⟨a,b⟩, ⟨b,a⟩, ⟨b,b⟩, ⟨c,c⟩, ⟨c,d⟩, ⟨d,c⟩, ⟨d,d⟩ }, more briefly denoted as a≈b,c≈d, is an equivalence relation on the set {a,b,c,d} of automaton A’s states.
Building the quotient of A by that relation results in automaton C in the third table row; it is formally defined by 
 ΣC = {0,1},
 SC = {a,c},
 s = a,
 δC = { ⟨a,1,a⟩, ⟨a,0,c⟩, ⟨c,0,c⟩ }, and
 S = { a,c }.
It recognizes the finite set of all strings composed of arbitrarily many 1s, followed by arbitrarily many 0s, i.e. { ε, 1, 10, 100, 1000, ..., 11, 110, 1100, 11000, ..., 111, ... }; this set can also be denoted by the regular expression "1*0*".
Informally, C can be thought of resulting from A by glueing state  onto state b, and glueing state c onto state d.

The table shows some more quotient relations, such as B = A/a≈b, and D = C/a≈c.

Properties
 For every automaton A and every equivalence relation ≈ on its states set, L(A/≈) is a superset of (or equal to) L(A).
 Given a finite automaton A over some alphabet Σ, an equivalence relation ≈ can be defined on Σ* by x ≈ y if ∀ z ∈ Σ*: xz ∈ L(A) ↔ yz ∈ L(A). By the Myhill–Nerode theorem, A/≈ is a deterministic automaton that recognizes the same language as A. As a consequence, the quotient of A by every refinement of ≈ also recognizes the same language as A.

See also
Quotient group
Quotient category

Notes

References

Finite automata